Wells Street Bridge is a historic Whipple truss bridge spanning the St. Marys River at Fort Wayne, Indiana.  It was built by the Wrought Iron Bridge Company of Akron, Ohio and erected by Alvin John Stewart in 1884.  It has a 180 foot long span and is 23 feet wide.  It was closed to vehicular traffic in 1982 and used as a pedestrian walkway.

It was added to the National Register of Historic Places in 1988.

References

External links

Road bridges on the National Register of Historic Places in Indiana
Bridges completed in 1884
Buildings and structures in Fort Wayne, Indiana
National Register of Historic Places in Fort Wayne, Indiana
Wrought iron bridges in the United States
Whipple truss bridges in the United States
Transportation buildings and structures in Allen County, Indiana